Melvin Choo Kwok Ming (born 24 July 1970) is a Singaporean auto racing driver.

Career

Choo competed in the final two rounds of the 2008 FIA World Touring Car Championship, becoming the first driver from Singapore to compete in the WTCC. He drove for the Thunder Asia Racing Team in  a BMW 320si with a best placed result of 20th at Okayama Circuit, Japan. He also finished as runner-up in Division Two of the Asian Touring Car Championship in 2008, after finishing third in 2007. Other races participated in 2008 includes the Aston Martin Asia Cup, and finishing as runner-up in Class B of the Porsche Carrera Cup Asia.

In 2009 Super GT season, Choo spot-raced in the Malaysia round for the Thunder Asia Racing with Martin Short and becomes the first Singapore driver in the event. Their team finished 13th in GT300 class. He and the team would be fully involved in the 2010 Super GT season, while he was also appointed as the official negotiator of Super GT to promote the event in Singapore, including a possibility to bringing the race to Singapore in future.

Complete WTCC results
(key) (Races in bold indicate pole position) (Races in italics indicate fastest lap)

Complete Super GT results

References

1970 births
Living people
Singaporean racing drivers
World Touring Car Championship drivers
Super GT drivers